Kieran Marc Robinson (born 6 May 1989) is a former English professional footballer who played as a defensive midfielder. He is renowned for his athleticism and ability in the air which is unusual for a player of his size.

Career statistics

Club
In the 2022/23 season, it was reported that Kieran Robinson had signed for HKFC Club Albion.

Notes

References

External links
 Yau Yee Football League profile

Living people
1989 births
English footballers
Association football midfielders
Hong Kong First Division League players
Hong Kong Premier League players
Hong Kong FC players
English expatriate footballers
English expatriate sportspeople in Hong Kong
Expatriate footballers in Hong Kong